Nila Ann Håkedal (born 13 June 1979 in Kristiansand) is a Norwegian female beach volleyball player.

Håkedal was born and raised in the city of Kristiansand, and lived there until she was 20 years old. She started playing volleyball for Hånes VBK when she was 13, and continued in the club until she moved to Oslo during the autumn of 1999 to play for Koll volleyball club, and to study languages.

Håkedal started playing beach volleyball during the summer of 1995, and between 1995 and 2001 she played with Lise Roald Hansen as partner. Her beach volleyball partner since 2002 has been Ingrid Tørlen. The pair competed in the 2004 Summer Olympics in Athens where they placed 22nd.

References

External links 
 Ingrid og Nila – Site of Ingrid Tørlen and Nila Håkedal (in Norwegian)

1979 births
Living people
Norwegian women's volleyball players
Norwegian beach volleyball players
Women's beach volleyball players
Olympic beach volleyball players of Norway
Beach volleyball players at the 2004 Summer Olympics
Beach volleyball players at the 2008 Summer Olympics
Sportspeople from Kristiansand
21st-century Norwegian women